The 1989–90 season of the Venezuelan Primera División, the top category of Venezuelan football, was played by 16 teams. The national champions were Marítimo.

Results

First stage

Championship playoff

External links
Venezuela 1990 season at RSSSF

Venezuelan Primera División seasons
Ven
Ven
1989–90 in Venezuelan football